Simon A. Sanchez High School (SSHS) is a public secondary school located in the village of Yigo, in the United States territory of Guam. The school is a part of the Guam Department of Education.

Overview 
Simon Sanchez High serves all of Yigo and a portion of Dededo village.

History 
The school opened as a middle school in 1974 and became a high school in 1981 to serve northeastern Guam.

In 2013, the school was temporary shutdown by Guam Department of Education.

Leadership 
The current Principal and Assistant Principals are:

 Principal: Carla D. Masnayon
 Assistant Principals: Jessica Fejeran, Jesse San Nicolas, Melvin Finona, Keith Quiambao

References

External links

 Simon Sanchez High School at ed.gov
 Simon Sanchez High School
 
 Simon Sanchez High School (1999-2000)
 Sanchez tentatively set to open next Tuesday

Public high schools in Guam
1981 establishments in Guam
Educational institutions established in 1981
Yigo, Guam